Jean-François Calmes (born 6 January 1971) is a Monegasque bobsledder. He competed at the 1998 Winter Olympics and the 2002 Winter Olympics.

References

1971 births
Living people
Monegasque male bobsledders
Olympic bobsledders of Monaco
Bobsledders at the 1998 Winter Olympics
Bobsledders at the 2002 Winter Olympics
Sportspeople from Nice